Birama Gaye (born 1964) is a Mauritanian football manager.

Gaye has managed Mauritanean clubs ASC Nasr de Sebkha and ASC Tevragh-Zeïne.

He has managed the Mauritania national football team on several occasions, most recently in 2000.

References

1964 births
Living people
Mauritanian football managers
Mauritania national football team managers